Chaharduli Rural District may refer to:
 Chaharduli Rural District (Hamadan Province)
 Chaharduli Rural District (Shahin Dezh County), West Azerbaijan province

See also
 Chaharduli-ye Gharbi Rural District, Kurdistan province
 Chaharduli-ye Sharqi Rural District, Kurdistan province